The 2017 WNBA All-Star Game was an exhibition basketball game played on July 22, 2017. The Seattle Storm hosted a WNBA All-Star Game for the first time. 

Starters for this year's All-Star game were selected by a combination of fan, media, and player voting. Fans accounted for 50% of the vote to determine the starters for Verizon WNBA All-Star 2017, while current players and a media panel accounted for 25% each. Maya Moore, of the Minnesota Lynx was the overall leader in votes with 32,866, with Elena Delle Donne, of the Washington Mystics, finishing in 2nd with 31,414 votes. 

The Western Conference defeated the Eastern Conference with a 130-121 victory. Maya Moore was named MVP. Allie Quigley of the Chicago Sky won the Three-Point Contest.

Coaches
The Minnesota Lynx and the New York Liberty had the best records in the Western and Eastern Conferences during the 2016 season, therefore making Cheryl Reeve and Bill Laimbeer the head coaches of the Western and Eastern Conference, respectively. Due to a family matter, Laimbeer was not able to coach. Curt Miller of the Connecticut Sun was named as his replacement, by having the best regular-season record in the East as of July 10th. This is Reeve's third time coaching in the All-Star Game and Miller's first.

Roster
The All-Star Game starters were announced on July 11, 2017 during SportsCenter. The All-Star Game reserves were announced on July 18, 2017 during the Seattle-Chicago game on ESPN2.

Eastern Conference
Tiffany Hayes of the Atlanta Dream and Jasmine Thomas of the Connecticut Sun were named the backcourt starters in the East, both of them earning their first All Star appearances. Elena Delle Donne of the Washington Mystics, her fourth selection, Tina Charles of the New York Liberty, her fifth selection, and Jonquel Jones of the Connecticut Sun, her first selection, were named the frontcourt starters.

The East reserves include Layshia Clarendon of the Atlanta Dream, Allie Quigley of the Chicago Sky, Alyssa Thomas of the Connecticut Sun, Stefanie Dolson of the Chicago Sky, Candice Dupree of the Indiana Fever, and Elizabeth Williams of the Atlanta Dream. With Delle Donne missing the game due to injury, Sugar Rodgers of the New York Liberty was named as a replacement. Clarendon, Quigley, Rodgers, Thomas, and Williams were all selected for the first time in their careers, while Dupree and Dolson were selected for their 6th and 2nd times, respectively.

Western Conference
Sue Bird of the Seattle Storm and Diana Taurasi of the Phoenix Mercury were named the starting backcourt in the West, earning their tenth and eighth selections, respectively. In the frontcourt, Maya Moore of the Minnesota Lynx was named to her fifth selection, along with Candace Parker of the Los Angeles Sparks and Sylvia Fowles of the Minnesota Lynx, both earning their fourth selection.

The West reserves include Seimone Augustus of the Minnesota Lynx, Skylar Diggins-Smith of the Dallas Wings, Chelsea Gray of the Los Angeles Sparks, Brittney Griner of the Phoenix Mercury, Nneka Ogwumike of the Los Angeles Sparks, and Breanna Stewart of the Seattle Storm. With Griner missing the game due to injury, Rebekkah Brunson of the Minnesota Lynx was named as a replacement. Gray and Stewart were named to their first All-Star teams, Brunson, Ogwumike, and Griner were named to their fourth team, Diggins-Smith was named to her third team, and Augustus was named to her seventh team.

Rosters

Notes
 Elena Delle Donne and Brittney Griner were unable to participate due to injuries. Griner suffered knee and ankle injuries and Delle Donne sustained a sprained ankle
Starting for Injured Player
Injury Replacement

Game

Three-Point Contest
Five contestants participated in the Three-Point Contest, held during halftime of the All-Star Game. This was the first such contest held since the Stars at the Sun event that replaced the All-Star Game in 2010. Allie Quigley won the Three-Point Shootout with a Final Round score of 27 points. She defeated Sugar Rodgers, who scored 19 points. Quigley played for the Patrick Quigley Memorial Scholarship charity, which received $10,000 due to Quigley's win.

References

2017 WNBA season
Women's National Basketball Association All-Star Game